The Great Olympic Encyclopedia is the 3rd Olympic encyclopedia in Russian, issued by the Bolshaya Rossiyskaya entsiklopediya state publisher. In 2007, the Great Olympic Encyclopedia has been included in Yandex.Dictionaries.

Summary 
The encyclopedia has only one author Valeri Shteinbakh, and contains 10,070 entries about the history of the Ancient Olympic Games, the results of the Summer Olympic Games and the Winter Olympic Games, the sports included or not in the Olympics, biographies of the sportspersons and other trivia.

References

External links
Great Olympic Encyclopedia online 

Russian encyclopedias
Russian-language encyclopedias
2007 non-fiction books
History of the Olympics
21st-century encyclopedias
Specialized encyclopedias